The Potbelleez is the self-titled debut album by the Australian band The Potbelleez. The first two singles from The Potbelleez, "Don't Hold Back", and "Are You with Me", were both smash hits. Other singles released include "Trouble Trouble" and "Duuurty Dreemz".

Track listing
Australian version
"Trouble Trouble"
"Ours to Rock"
"Don't Hold Back"
"Are You with Me"
"Showbiz"
"Bad Boy Tune"
"Everything"
"Hold On"
"Crystalize"
"Pog Ma Thon"
"Junkyard"
"Duuurty Dreemz"
"Summertime"

Exclusive remix CD
"Trouble Trouble" (Carl Kennedy Remix)
"Are You with Me" (Mr Timothy Remix)
"Don't Hold Back" (Markus Gardweg Remix)
"Junkyard" (Vandalism Remix)
"Duuurty Dreemz" (Mind Electric Remix)

Singles
 "Don't Hold Back" was released as the first single in late 2007, peaking at No. 5 on the Australian ARIA Singles Chart. It was certified 3 x platinum, and has sold more than 210,000 copies in Australia.
 "Are You with Me" peaked at No. 15 on the Australian Singles Chart.
 "Trouble Trouble" was released to radio in September 2008, and debuted at No. 72 on the Australian Singles Chart, eventually peaking at #54.

Charts

Release history

References

2008 albums
The Potbelleez albums